Mesorah High School for Girls is a private Orthodox Jewish high school for girls in Dallas, Texas.

Scheduled to open in August 2000 with grades 9 and 10, it was the first Jewish girls' high school in the city and the third all-girls' school in Dallas. It is the only Jewish girls' high school in the Southwestern United States. It initially had seven students.

 the school uniforms include ankle-length skirts and long-sleeved shirts. The school teaches Jewish religious subjects and secular subjects.

See also
 History of the Jews in Dallas
 Hockaday School for Girls
 Ursuline Academy of Dallas

References

External links
 Mesorah High School for Girls

High schools in Dallas County, Texas
Jews and Judaism in Dallas
Jewish day schools in Texas
Private high schools in Texas
Private schools in Dallas
Educational institutions established in 2000
Girls' schools in Texas
Preparatory schools in Texas
2000 establishments in Texas